Saga Records was a British independent record label first established in 1958. It pioneered budget-priced light classical music and jazz LPs.

Origins 
The Saga Records label emerged from Saga Films Ltd, a venture established by the British pianist Leonard Cassini (1913–1999) who had studied at the Curtis Institute in Philadelphia and broadcast frequently on the BBC from 1939 to 1974, including an appearance at the Proms in 1957. From 1955 he made films such as Watch the Music for BBC TV, and having performed in Eastern Europe he had the contacts to create BBC TV documentaries using state film units in Warsaw, East Berlin and  Budapest. He registered Saga Films in October 1955, apparently with the intention of making films about composers, but lacked financial backing.

'Saga Records' initial releases 
Cassini attracted investment from Wilfred Alonzo Banks, ACCA (1913–1983), a major in the Royal Army Service Corps in World War II where he was mentioned in despatches, and who had subsequently developed a business to import and distribute toys and decorations. He backed Cassini's proposal to create a new classical music label, but felt that neither he nor Cassini knew how to run such a business, so in March 1958 employed William Barrington-Coupe, whose own Concert Artists label had recently collapsed, as his A&R manager.

Until the late 1950s, with very few exceptions, British recording studios were owned by major record companies. Orchestral recording was subject to strict union rules and the margin on record sales was small. Quality 12in LPs cost c. 30/- (£1.50: equivalent to £30 in 2020) of which half went in manufacturing and purchase tax, and distribution and dealers took much of the rest. Tape recording had been developed in Germany in the 1930s, but only became available in the UK when German tape machines, captured at the end of the war, were reverse-engineered. By 1958, tape recording had become affordable and portable, making it possible to record on location with a minimum of staff.

Through their European connections, Barrington-Coupe and Banks approached producer Paul Lazare in Hamburg who had access to a studio and session musicians at low cost, some of whom were attached to the Sinfonieorchester des Norddeutschen Rundfunks. Saga sent pianists Sergio Fiorentino and Joyce Hatto, both of whom were on Barrington-Coupe's books, to recording sessions Hamburg in 1958, and the orchestra was mostly directed by Erich Riede. James Lock, Barrington-Coupe's recording engineer at this time, would go on to make around five hundred recordings for Decca.They also recorded the Royal Danish Orchestra  in Copenhagen under John Frandsen with Eileen Joyce and Alan Loveday. Some Russian tapes were procured, possibly through Cassini's Soviet contacts, so the public was offered quite a substantial selection of LPs, EPs and tapes when the first catalogue was published in September 1958. They were initially released by Saga Films Ltd and some of the discs were pressed by Pathé. The discs arrived in record shops in October priced at 25/- (£1.25) and competed with the major record companies' re-release labels. "High fidelity" tape releases were marketed by Elizabethan (Tape Recorders) Ltd branded as "Saga-Elizabethan" at 35/- (£1.75). At this stage, they were all mono recordings.

Collapse and sale of the business 
The major British labels started releasing stereo LPs in mid 1958, but continued to press mono releases for some years. In October 1959 Saga advertised a short-lived Stereo Multi-Play offering “for perfect reproduction on either monaural or stereo record players, thanks to a special cutting technique” at the challenging price of 45/- (£2.25). By then, with further expensive recording sessions in Germany and loss-making promotional concerts in London, Saga's capital was running out. A licensing deal for distribution of Saga's tapes in the USA was struck with Roulette, who created the Forum label specially for its classical releases. Barrington-Coupe was advertising recordings that had not yet been made, including a Beethoven symphony cycle.

In February 1960, Barrington-Coupe and record producer Joe Meek formed Triumph (Superfi) Sound Ltd, targeting a teenage market was just emerging in the UK. Following a clash of personalities, largely due to the different markets addressed by Saga and Triumph, Meek walked out in September. He  took his artists with him to a new independent production company, RGM Sound Ltd, again backed by Wilfred Banks.

Whilst other independent labels relied on budget releases of well-known orchestras hiding behind a pseudonym, Saga traded on its recognised artists. A recording of items from West Side Story was conducted by Lawrence Leonard, who had been chosen by Leonard Bernstein to conduct the London premiere. Concert promotions of Saga recording stars at the Royal Festival Hall and elsewhere were scheduled to promote the label in early 1960. The London Philharmonic Choir and orchestra with soloists Harper, Watts, Robertson and Stalman under Frederic Jackson were engaged to record Handel's Messiah in May 1960, and further Hamburg sessions led to a cash crisis. Barrington-Coupe arranged to sell about fifty unissued master tapes to Marcel Rodd, but creditors foreclosed in July. The Official Receiver held Barrington-Coupe responsible for the company's collapse.

Barrington-Coupe walked away, taking his artists with him, and Wilfred Banks was left with the master tapes and the Saga name. With no staff, facilities or artists on his books, Banks traded the business and its rights in over 300 master recordings to Marcel Rodd of Allied Records/Classics Club for 1,000 bargain "Lyrique" LPs, a deal completed in March 1961 once he had established that Barrington Coupe had no copyright claim over the tapes.

Expansion under Allied Records 
The tapes that Rodd's Allied Records had acquired from Saga Saga Films included musicals, "light classical" releases, dance and jazz bands, theatre organs and popular singers as well as classical favourites.There were over three hundred Saga titles, fifty that had belonged to Barrington-Coupe plus another hundred mono Russian recordings that had originally been imported in 1954 by the James Quality Recording Company and partially released under the Monarch label between 1954 and 1956. Saga had not used them, possibly because they were not stereo.

In March 1961 Rodd hired Ted Perry (who was later to establish Hyperion) as label manager. Perry created a new full-price Celebrity sub-label which featured the Fine Arts Quartet and made John Shirley-Quirk's debut recording.

Barrington-Coupe by now had set up a new budget label, Fidelio, retailing at 12/6 (62½p) and Rodd responded with Fidelity. He reused some of the Lyrique masters which he had previously sold to Banks and acquired tapes from the French budget label Guilde Européene du Microsillon (GEM), many without documented attribution. Perry was left to sort out the details, including inventing artists for unattributed tapes and deleting tapes which had deteriorated, such as the Urania catalogue. Rodd was a difficult employer and Perry left Saga within eighteen months.

In February 1962 Marcel Rodd moved to a large Victorian house near Swiss Cottage where he converted the basement ballroom into a recording studio and set up Saga's offices on the ground floor. He and his family lived above. The disk cutting and record pressing was done at a factory in North Kensington. Robin O'Connor was recruited to replace Perry and recalled his job interview in April 1964 with Marcel Rodd:" ... where the man himself was propped up in bed, resplendent in black pyjamas ... papers strewn all over the bed, the man's piercing gaze, the gruff voice barking out sharp questions."Rodd acquired two more failed record businesses in May 1963; the Record Society, which had promoted a specialist catalogue, and Associated Recordings which had imported Czech Supraphon discs and licensed USSR Melodiya recordings as well as Westminster's quality classical catalogue from the USA. Rodd's Classics Club label was wound up in mid 1964 and the enlarged Saga Records moved into a former paint factory at 326, Kensal Road. The non-classical repertoire was shifted onto the Society and Presto labels and the Celebrity series discontinued. Choral and organ repertoire arrived with the acquisition of Alpha Records, Oxford in 1966 and some baroque and classical chamber music was licensed from Amadeo on condition that pseudonyms concealed the musicians’ identities. Label managers came and went over the next few years.

Stereo LPs introduced 
By 1965 it was clear that the market wanted only stereo recordings and mono tapes were "remastered" to create a stereo effect. Saga engineers used a phase splitter and a couple of equalisers to split the signal into two, adding top frequencies to the 'A' channel (where most of the orchestral strings are usually placed) and a bit of bass to 'B' to emphasise the cellos and basses. However, the rise of budget re-release labels, such as Classics for Pleasure backed by EMI, made it difficult to market these older pseudo-stereo recordings and by the end of the decade new releases were so sparse that regular advertising in Gramophone dried up in 1971.

Investment in artists and repertoire 
Rodd re-hired Ted Perry as Artists and Repertoire Manager in March 1973 and gave him scope to make the sort of recordings he wanted to make. Martin Compton, a music graduate, was already on Saga's staff and became studio producer and John Shuttleworth, a teacher at Eltham College was recoding engineer. recording venues with better acoustics also helped to restore Saga's reputation. Perry placed an advertisement in Gramophone claiming that new equipment produced LPs pressed “to the highest standards”, though Saga's reputation for poor quality pressing persisted. Perry launched three remastered series; SAGA 5000 budget LPs with re-released Shirley-Quirk and Baker records costing 71p, SAGA 6000 jazz LPs at £1.25, and SAGA 7000 'immortals' featuring Caruso, Melba, etc. at 95p. In 1977, Perry moved on again to set up Meridian Records before creating Hyperion.

Martin Compton continued producing releases and the last new titles produced by Nicholas Dicker were added in 1984. From 1979 Saga's discs were pressed by Teldec in Germany.

Legacy 
Saga's master tapes at the suggestion of Nicholas Dicker were donated by Marcel Rodd to the British Library Sound Archive in March 1989, with licence fees passed to the Saga Trust. The Trust supports the British Library Edison Fellowship programme, designed to encourage scholarship devoted to the history of recordings or western art music and music in performance.

Saga Classics 
In 1990 Sound-Products Holland B.V. licensed the tapes for transfer to CD and began to issue the discs in 1992, but ceased trading year later. The series was taken over by Emergo Classics until 1997, who released 46 CDs. Half of these titles originated in the 1970s, and another quarter from earlier Saga or Classics Club sessions. The balance were 1950s recordings from various sources, four of Russian origin.

Catalogue numbers

References 

British record labels
Classical music record labels
Defunct record labels of the United Kingdom